The following highways are numbered 259:

Brazil
 BR-259

Canada
Manitoba Provincial Road 259
Prince Edward Island Route 259
 Quebec Route 259

Japan
 Japan National Route 259

United States

 U.S. Route 259
 Alabama State Route 259
 California State Route 259
 Florida State Road 259 (former)
 Georgia State Route 259 (former)
 Iowa Highway 259 (former)
 Kentucky Route 259
 Maryland Route 259
 Minnesota State Highway 259 (former)
 Montana Secondary Highway 259
 New York State Route 259
 Oklahoma State Highway 259A
 Pennsylvania Route 259
 Tennessee State Route 259
 Texas State Highway 259 (former)
 Utah State Route 259
 Virginia State Route 259
 West Virginia Route 259
 Wyoming Highway 259